The South River is one of the two main tributaries of the South Fork of the Shenandoah River. It begins south of Waynesboro, Virginia, and flows northward to Port Republic, where it merges with the North River to form the South Fork.

Communities along the route 
The South River flows through Stuarts Draft, Waynesboro, Dooms, Crimora, Harriston, Grottoes, and Port Republic.

Ecology 
In Waynesboro, the DuPont (now Invista) plant and others polluted the river with mercury.  The South River in Waynesboro is one of two urban fisheries in the state. There is a fish consumption advisory (mercury) for all species in South River, except for trout. It is recommended by the Virginia Department of Health that no fish be eaten from this river except trout. For more information go to: Virginia Department of Health at: http://www.vdh.virginia.gov/Epidemiology/dee/PublicHealthToxicology/Advisories/

See also
List of rivers of Virginia

References

External links 
 Virginia Department of Game and Inland Fisheries
 Fly Fishing on the South River

Rivers of Virginia
Rivers of Augusta County, Virginia
Rivers of Rockingham County, Virginia
Waynesboro, Virginia
Tributaries of the Shenandoah River